Fátima Ileana Molina Vargas (born 9 March 1986) artistically known as Fátima Molina is a Mexican actress and singer, best known for her role as Lidya Corona in the Telemundo's series La Doña (2016–2017), followed by her debut as the protagonist in the Sony Pictures Television's series Tres Milagros (2018). In films she has stood out for I Dream in Another Language, for which she was nominated at the Ariel Award for Best Supporting Actress.

Biography 
Molina born in Ensenada, Baja California, Mexico, but then she moved to Guadalajara, Jalisco. She began her career doing school theater. She studied Performing Arts at the Instituto Escena 3 and began to have roles in theater in plays such as Rent and Chicago but it was not until 2008, when she participated in the reality show La Academia 6: Última generación of Televisión Azteca when her career began to take off.

Filmography

Film roles

Television roles

References

External links 
 

1986 births
Living people
Mexican film actresses
Mexican stage actresses
Mexican television actresses
Mexican telenovela actresses
21st-century Mexican actresses